The Ulster Minor Football Championship is the Minor "knockout" competition in the game of Gaelic football played in the province of Ulster in Ireland. The series of games are organised by the Ulster Council. The trophy for the winning side is The Liam Murray Cup. The competition began in 1930, with Armagh winning during the inaugural year. The most successful county to date is Tyrone who have won on 25 occasions. The winner and the beaten finalist represent Ulster in the All-Ireland Minor Football Championship.

List of winners by county

Finals listed by year

 1935 Final Down 2–02 Donegal 2-01 Objection and counter objection. Competition declared null and void.

See also
 Munster Minor Football Championship
 Leinster Minor Football Championship
 Connacht Minor Football Championship

References

 Roll of Honour on gaainfo.com
 Complete Roll of Honour on Kilkenny GAA bible

External links
 "Ulster Minor Championship winners". BBC. 2008.

 Ulster
4